Bernard Bajolet (born 21 May 1949) is a French diplomat and civil servant. On 10 April 2013 he was appointed as head of the French secret service, the Directorate-General for External Security (Direction générale des services extérieurs). He was the French Ambassador to Afghanistan from 2011 to 2013.

Early life
Bajolet was born in 1949 at Dombasle-sur-Meurthe and went to Lycée Henri Poincaré in Nancy, France.  He then studied at Paris' Sciences Po, and graduated from the École nationale d'administration in 1975.  That same year he joined the diplomatic service.

On October 18, 2022, Bernard Bajolet is indicted for "complicity in attempted extortion" and "arbitrary attack on individual freedom by a person holding public authority", against Alain Dumenil, a Franco-Swiss businessman who accuses the intelligence service of having used coercion to demand money from him in 2016..

Diplomatic career

1975-1978: Deuxième Secrétaire and then Premier Secrétaire at Algiers
1978-1979: at the Administration centrale (Information and Press for European issues)
1979-1981: au Cabinet du Secrétaire d’Etat aux Affaires Etrangères, responsible for relations with the European Parliament
1981-1985: deuxième Conseiller at Rome
1985-1986: at Harvard University
1986-1990: deuxième Conseiller at Damascus
1991-1994: at the Administration Centrale, (Directeur Adjoint for North Africa and the Middle East)
1991: Special envoy to the Madrid Conference of 1991
1994-1998: French ambassador to Jordan
1999-2003: Ambassador to Bosnia and Herzegovina
Sept. 2003-Aug. 2006: Chief of the section of French interests and then Ambassador to Iraq
Nov. 2006-2008: Ambassador and High Representative to Algeria
July 2008-Feb. 2011: coordinator of intelligence for President Nicolas Sarkozy as head of the Conseil national du renseignement
2011-2013: Ambassador to Afghanistan

References

1949 births
Living people
Harvard University people
École nationale d'administration alumni
Sciences Po alumni
Ambassadors of France to Afghanistan
Ambassadors of France to Algeria
Ambassadors of France to Jordan
Ambassadors of France to Bosnia and Herzegovina
Ambassadors of France to Iraq
Officiers of the Légion d'honneur